Amaara: The Song of the Whales is a 2021 German documentary film directed by Sebastian Jobst.

The world premiere took place on May 20, 2021 at the Illuminate Film Festival in Arizona.

Synopsis 
Spiritual singer and healer Marina Trost, through her love for whales and music, demonstrates the connection between people and animals and how fragile this connection and the world as a whole is.

Cast 
 Anne Byrne as whale mother
 Denesa Chan as whale cinematographer
 Marina Trost as herself

Awards 
 Barcelona Planet Film Festival 2021 Award for Best Soundtrack
 Illuminate Film Festival 2021 Award for Best Film
 Queens World Film Festival 2021: Special Jury Award for the best poetic film
 Award of the Toronto International Women's Film Festival 2021 for the best environmental project

Production

Shooting incident
It is August 11, 2019, on the last day of shooting, 43-year-old jazz singer Marina Theresia Trost has a fatal accident while diving on the coast of ʻEua in the kingdom of Tonga.

References

External links

 Official website

2021 films
2021 documentary films
German documentary films
German independent films
Films about whales
Documentary films about Tonga
Crowdfunded films
2021 independent films
2020s German-language films